Kangundo District was a former administrative district in the Eastern Province of Kenya. The local climate is semi arid. The terrain is hilly, the district has an altitude from 1000 to 1600 metres above sea level. Akamba people are the dominant tribe.

In 2010, it was merged into Machakos County.

Altitude (feet): 5068; Lat (DMS): 
Altitude (meters): 1544; Time zone (est): UTC+3

See also 
Kangundo Constituency

External links 

Former districts of Kenya
Eastern Province (Kenya)